Poecilosoma misionum is a moth in the subfamily Arctiinae. It was described by Strand in 1915.

References

Natural History Museum Lepidoptera generic names catalog

Moths described in 1915
Arctiinae